The Bremen clause is Article 141 of the Basic Law for the Federal Republic of Germany.

Background
The clause states:

The sentence cited provides:

It limits the range of application of the constitutional (Basic Law) rule over religious education, making it possible to have other types of instruction in some areas of Germany. A well-known example is the "instruction in Biblical history" in Bremen. It is not religious education in the sense of the Basic Law, because its content is not accountable to a religious order; therefore it is not a "common affair" (res mixta).

References

Religious education
German constitutional law
State law in Germany